Jennifer Bachus is an American diplomat who served as Chargé d’Affaires, a.i. to the Czech Republic.  Since April 2022, she is the inaugural Principal Deputy Assistant Secretary for the Bureau of Cyberspace and Digital Policy.,

Bachus has a M.A. from the College of Europe in Bruges and her undergraduate degree is from Brown University.

References

American women diplomats
Brown University alumni
College of Europe alumni
Living people
Year of birth missing (living people)